The 2014 Red Rock Pro Open was a professional tennis tournament played on outdoor hard courts. It was the sixth edition of the tournament which was part of the 2014 ITF Women's Circuit, offering a total of $50,000 in prize money. It took place in Las Vegas, United States, on 22–28 September 2014.

Singles main draw entrants

Seeds 

 1 Rankings as of 15 September 2014

Other entrants 
The following players received wildcards into the singles main draw:
  Jennifer Brady
  Nicole Vaidišová
  Caitlin Whoriskey

The following players received entry from the qualifying draw:
  Kateryna Bondarenko
  Ema Burgić
  Samantha Crawford
  Alexa Glatch

Champions

Singles 

  Madison Brengle def.  Michelle Larcher de Brito, 6–1, 6–4

Doubles 

  Verónica Cepede Royg /  María Irigoyen def.  Asia Muhammad /  Maria Sanchez, 6–3, 5–7, [11–9]

External links 
 2014 Red Rock Pro Open at ITFtennis.com
 Official website

 
2014
2014 ITF Women's Circuit
2014 in American tennis
September 2014 sports events in the United States
2014 in sports in Nevada